Guaíra is a municipality in the state of Paraná in the Southern Region of Brazil. The population is 33,310 (2020 est.) in an area of 560 km². The elevation is 517 m. This place name comes from the Tupi language and means "place difficult to access". The city is served by Guaíra Airport. It borders the Paraguayan city of Salto del Guairá, across the Paraná River, which marks the border between Brazil and Paraguay. Just like its Paraguayan twin city, it is named after the Guaíra Falls, which was located on the border with Paraguay. The falls was submerged after the construction of the Itaipu Dam in 1982.

References

Municipalities in Paraná